Nerita bisecta is a species of sea snail, a marine gastropod mollusk in the family Neritidae.

Description

Distribution

References

Neritidae
Gastropods described in 1855